The A. B. Seger (sometimes called the Seger, Segar, or Segur) was acquired by the Confederate States Navy in 1861 for service as a gunboat in Berwick Bay, Louisiana. The steamer operated with the naval force of Flag Officer George N. Hollins, CSN, who was charged with the defence of the Mississippi River and Louisiana coast.

The little gunboat was powered by two locomotive engines with "cylinders bolted to the top of and axis parallel to" her boiler—also from a railway locomotive. During 1862 A. B. Seger served as a dispatch boat, commanded by Acting Master I. C. Coons. As the Federal Flotilla under Lt. Comdr. Buchanan proceeded up Atchafalaya Bay on 1 November 1862, A. B. Seger was run aground and abandoned near Berwick Bay. She was then seized and placed in service by the Union.

Specification 

References 

c
Gunboats of the Confederate States Navy
Ships captured by the United States Navy from the Confederate States Navy